David A. Arnold (March 15, 1968 – September 7, 2022) was an American stand-up comedian, sitcom writer, producer, and actor.

Stand-up comedy
Arnold began performing in 1997. He performed at the Canadian Montreal Comedy Festival, on Jamie Foxx Presents Laffapalooza  (Comedy Central) with Jamie Foxx and Cedric the Entertainer, The Tom Joyner Show, Baisden After Dark, Comics Unleashed with Byron Allen, ComicView (BET), The Mo'Nique Show (BET), Entourage (HBO) and Def Comedy Jam.

Screenwriter and actor
Arnold served as writer and producer for the Netflix revival series Fuller House. He wrote episodes of several comedy shows, including Bigger (BET+), Meet the Browns (TBS), The Rickey Smiley Show (TV One), Raising Whitley (OWN), Tyler Perry's House of Payne (TBS), and The Tony Rock Project (MyNetworkTV).

In 2021, Arnold created the Nickelodeon show That Girl Lay Lay and served as showrunner for the series. He appeared in several television series including Meet the Browns, A Series of Unfortunate People and The Tony Rock Project.

Arnold had two stand-up comedy specials on Netflix, David A. Arnold: Fat Ballerina and It Ain't For The Weak (July 2022).

Personal life
Arnold was married to Julie L. Harkness; the couple had two daughters, Anna-Grace (2005) and Ashlyn (2007).  He was of African-American ancestry.

Death
Arnold died on September 7, 2022, at the age of 54, while at home due to natural causes.

An episode of That Girl Lay Lay titled "Dylan and Rebecca's Cleve-Land-Land Adventure" was dedicated to Arnold.

References

External links

1968 births
2022 deaths
American male comedians
American stand-up comedians
African-American male comedians
African-American stand-up comedians
20th-century American comedians
21st-century American comedians
Male actors from Cleveland
Comedians from Ohio
Showrunners
20th-century African-American people
21st-century American screenwriters
21st-century African-American writers
African-American television writers
Writers from Cleveland
American male television writers
American television writers
Screenwriters from Ohio